San Marino competed at the 2022 Mediterranean Games held in Oran, Algeria from 25 June to 6 July 2022.

Medalists

| width="78%" align="left" valign="top" |

Archery

San Marino competed in archery.

Boules

San Marino won three medals in boules.

Shooting

San Marino won one medal in shooting.

Swimming

San Marino competed in swimming.

Men

Taekwondo

San Marino competed in Taekwondo.

 Legend
 PTG — Won by Points Gap
 SUP — Won by superiority
 OT — Won on over time (Golden Point)
 DQ — Won by disqualification
 PUN — Won by punitive declaration
 WD — Won by withdrawal

Men

Tennis

San Marino competed in tennis.

Wrestling

San Marino won two medals in wrestling.

Men's freestyle wrestling

References

Nations at the 2022 Mediterranean Games
2022
Mediterranean Games